The Seddinsee is a lake in the south-eastern outskirts of Berlin, the capital city of Germany. The lake is aligned south-west to north-east, with its south-western end adjacent to the Berlin suburb of Schmöckwitz. Here the Seddinsee meets the Zeuthener See and Langer See, two lakes that form part of the course of the River Dahme.

The Seddinsee is navigable. Several little islands are in the lake. Besides its natural connection to the River Dahme, the Oder-Spree Canal enters the lake on its eastern shore, whilst the Gosen Canal links the lake's northern end to the Dämeritzsee. Besides seeing considerable sightseeing and leisure traffic, the lake also forms a link in several commercial navigation routes, including the route from Berlin to Poland via the River Dahme and the Oder-Spree Canal.

References

LSeddinsee
Lakes of Berlin
Treptow-Köpenick
Oder-Spree
Federal waterways in Germany